Penelope Marjorie Windust (July 13, 1945 – February 2, 2022) was an American television, film, and stage actress. She was known for her role as Kathleen Maxwell in the 1983 miniseries V.

Biography
Windust was born in New York City, the daughter of Irene, an actress, and Bretaigne Windust, a stage and film director. She studied drama at Pittsburgh's Carnegie Tech just before its merger into Carnegie Mellon University in 1967. 

Windust began her career on Broadway, appearing in a 1967 production of Spofford with Melvyn Douglas, and in 1972 production of Elizabeth I. Windust has starred in many television movies. Her best-known film roles were in the movies Ghost Town and Bird in 1988. Her final movie appearance was You Don't Mess with the Zohan in 2008.

She made many guest appearances on television, including Hawaii Five-O, The Six Million Dollar Man, Falcon Crest, Dallas, Matlock, Criminal Minds, ER, Third Watch and Boston Legal. She died on February 2, 2022, at the age of 76.

Filmography

Film

Television

Stage credits

References

External links
 
 

1945 births
2022 deaths
Actresses from New York City
American film actresses
American stage actresses
American television actresses
Carnegie Mellon University College of Fine Arts alumni